Bellwood is a village in Proviso Township, Cook County, Illinois, United States. The population was 18,789 at the 2020 census.

History
Bellwood was incorporated on May 21, 1900. The municipality took its name from one of the village's early subdivisions, "Bellewood". However, in later years, the final "e" was dropped.
The region, which was mostly flat grassland, was initially mostly farmland. A few businesses, including a few taverns, were drawn to the initial subdivision. In reaction to dry Maywood's effort to annex the area, businesses that served alcohol petitioned for incorporation. Between 1900 and 1930, Bellwood's population numbers increased steadily. By 1920, the village's population of 943 had more than quadrupled, with many German and Russian immigrants. The increase to 4,991 persons in 1930 is due to the annexation of territory west of Mannheim Road in 1926, as well as ongoing migration.

The Chicago, Aurora and Elgin Railway and the Chicago & North Western Railway provided rail passenger service, which promoted residential growth in neighboring portions of Bellwood. The 1970s saw racial upheaval and inclusion in a Supreme Court case in the United States. Bellwood sued a local real estate company in 1975, alleging racial discrimination. Four years later, the Supreme Court issued a historic decision allowing governments to utilize testers and sue when discrimination occurs. The black population of Bellwood jumped from 1.1 percent in 1970 to 35 percent in 1980 and 70 percent in 1990.

A few major firms exist in Bellwood today, but the collapse of many other large sectors has resulted in a decrease in employment and tax revenue. Despite these contributions, the community saw some new development as a result of various minor industrial and commercial organizations.

Geography

Demographics
As of the 2020 census there were 18,789 people, 6,059 households, and 4,310 families residing in the village. The racial makeup of the village was 68.35% African American, 6.67% White, 0.96% Native American, 0.72% Asian, 0.02% Pacific Islander, 15.83% from other races, and 7.45% from two or more races. Hispanic or Latino of any race were 26.79% of the population.

There were 6,059 households, out of which 48.31% had children under the age of 18 living with them, 38.54% were married couples living together, 26.18% had a female householder with no husband present, and 28.87% were non-families. 27.03% of all households were made up of individuals, and 12.44% had someone living alone who was 65 years of age or older. The average household size was 3.79 and the average family size was 3.09.

The village's age distribution consisted of 23.7% under the age of 18, 8.9% from 18 to 24, 27.8% from 25 to 44, 25.5% from 45 to 64, and 14.2% who were 65 years of age or older. The median age was 36.1 years. For every 100 females, there were 84.4 males. For every 100 females age 18 and over, there were 77.3 males.

The median income for a household in the village was $63,006, and the median income for a family was $69,730. Males had a median income of $38,361 versus $32,466 for females. The per capita income for the village was $27,244. About 8.3% of families and 11.1% of the population were below the poverty line, including 13.1% of those under age 18 and 12.3% of those age 65 or over.

Note: the US Census treats Hispanic/Latino as an ethnic category. This table excludes Latinos from the racial categories and assigns them to a separate category. Hispanics/Latinos can be of any race.

Government
Andre F. Harvey is the current and Bellwood's first African-American mayor.

Education
The Bellwood School District 88 comprises seven schools: Grant Primary School, Grant Elementary School, Lincoln Primary–Early Childhood Center, Lincoln Elementary School, McKinley Elementary School, Thurgood Marshall Elementary School and Roosevelt Middle School. Some portions are zoned to Berkeley School District 87.

MECA Christian Academy is a private school.

Infrastructure

Transportation
The village is serviced by a Metra railroad station with commuter service to Chicago. In November 2011, Union Pacific Railroad announced plans to renovate and upgrade Bellwood's Metra station and add a third rail line. The project, estimated at $4 million, was expected to be completed by the fall of 2012 at no cost to residents.
Bellwood formerly had a station on the Chicago Great Western Railway main line before it was abandoned in 1968 by the Chicago & Northwestern Railway. The Indiana Harbor Belt Railroad runs through Bellwood, but does not host any commuter rail traffic.

Notable people

 Lee J. Archambault, NASA astronaut, served aboard two space shuttle missions (STS-117 & STS-119)
 Eugene Cernan, NASA astronaut, commander of the Apollo 17 mission and "last man on the Moon," grew up in Bellwood.
 Robert Covington, small forward for the  Los Angeles Clippers, was born in Bellwood.
 Ben Tennyson, the fictional American superhero was portrayed as being born in Bellwood.

References

External links
 Village of Bellwood official website
 Bellwood Chamber of Commerce
 Memorial Park District
 Bellwood Public Library
 Bellwood School District

Villages in Illinois
Chicago metropolitan area
Villages in Cook County, Illinois
Populated places established in 1900
1900 establishments in Illinois
Majority-minority cities and towns in Cook County, Illinois